Lampugnani may refer to:

 Lampugnani (surname), an Italian surname
 , House of Lampugnani, an Italian family
 Lampugnani's Conspiracy, a painting by Francesco Hayez

See also 
 Lampugnano (disambiguation)